Ectoedemia degeeri is a moth of the family Nepticulidae. It is only known from Turkey.

The wingspan is 4.1-5.2 mm.

External links
Two new species in the Ectoedemia (Fomoria) weaveri-group from Asia (Lepidoptera: Nepticulidae)

Nepticulidae
Endemic fauna of Turkey
Moths described in 2008
Moths of Asia